Am 4/6 1101 was the world's first gas turbine-electric locomotive. The locomotive was ordered by the Swiss Federal Railways (SBB-CFF-FFS) from the Swiss Locomotive and Machine Works (SLM) and Brown, Boveri & Cie (BBC) in 1939. The locomotive was delivered in 1941 and was in use on railroads in Switzerland, France and Germany until 1954.

Development 

Prior to building Am 4/6 1101 BBC had built the world’s first industrial gas turbine in 1936 for the Marcus Hook refinery in Pennsylvania and the world's first gas turbine power station in 1938 at Neuchâtel, Switzerland. By the late 1930s, BBC were eager to apply the new gas turbine technology to railway locomotives.

Early in 1939, SBB placed an order, with BBC, for a gas turbine locomotive for service on non electrified branch lines. The specification for the locomotive included a guaranteed continuous output of  measured at the generator coupling. The maximum allowable weight of the locomotive for use on branch lines was set at 92 tons.

Technology

Construction
The locomotive was based on existing technology wherever possible to avoid failures of components not directly associated with the gas turbine from endangering the project. Electric power transmission was chosen because it had already shown its reliability in conjunction with diesel engines and because it allowed as many axles as desired to be driven, which was an important aspect because the weight per power output was much lower compared to diesel and steam engines of the time.

The turbine consisted of an air compressor, a combustion chamber and the turbine itself. The exhaust gases flowed through the heat exchanger, where they preheated the incoming air, and were ejected via the roof.

Starting the locomotive
First, an auxiliary diesel engine was started by the help of batteries. This engine was coupled to a generator which, in turn, provided electricity to start the turbine. The turbine was brought up to speed by the coupled generator (used as a motor). This process took about 4 minutes after which the turbine could be ignited and would run by itself. While the turbine continued to speed up, the electricity produced by the auxiliary diesel engine could now be used to shunt the locomotive at low speeds. After another four minutes, the turbine had reached its idle speed (100 rpm at the generator) at which point the locomotive was now operational.

Varying the power output
To increase the power output, the engineer turned his power controller, which had the following effects:
 More fuel was injected into the combustion chamber
 The speed governor was adjusted to achieve a higher rotation speed
 The overload protector noticed an overload situation (rotation speed lower than the target speed) and reduced the load on the turbine
Because of the lower load and the more fuel being injected, the rotation speed increased (up to 300 rpm at the generator under full load) and at some point the turbine reached its target speed, where the load was increased again up to the desired level to reach a new equilibrium between the turbine's power output and the power needed by the traction motors.

To decrease the load, the same processes happened in reverse.

Safety Features
If the engineer increased the power output of the turbine too late (example after a grade change instead of before it), then the rotation speed of the turbine might not have risen fast enough, too much fuel might have burnt and the turbine might have overheated. A temperature alarm was shown to the driver by a warning lamp; if he did not decrease the load, the fuel supply was cut after another rise of the temperature by 30 °C (54 °F).

In the event of a sudden loss of load where a rapid rise in rotation speed could not be compensated by the speed governor, a safety device would have decreased the air supply to the turbine.  The reduction in air supply would lead to a rise in temperature in the combustion chamber due to the lack of cold air which, in turn, would have led to the shutdown of the turbine due to over-temperature.

The combustion chamber was also monitored. If the temperature became too low (loss of ignition), the controller was designed to reignite the burners.  If this failed the controllers would shut down the oil supply after 5 seconds.

Efficiency
Peak efficiency of the gas turbine was 15-16%; note that these numbers do not include losses from the electrical power transmission. Efficiency was low compared to contemporary diesel engines which typically had fuel efficiencies around 26-28%. Poor efficiency was a major reason why gas turbine locomotives were not widely adopted.

Operating History
Am 4/6 1101 was delivered to SBB in 1941 after which it underwent a period of testing. From May 1943 to July 1944 the locomotive was trialed on the Winterthur-Stein-Säckingen line where it covered distance of around 50,000 km without incident. The locomotive went on to be used in experimental service across Switzerland, France and Germany covering some 410,000 km until September of 1954 when the turbine was damaged due to blade overheating. The root cause of the turbine blade failure was identified as faulty wiring of sensor cables. SBB decided not to fix the turbine due to the high repair cost and the relatively poor fuel efficiency of the locomotive.

In 1958, SBB decided to rebuild Am 4/6 1101 as an all-electric locomotive.  Renamed Ae 4/6 III 10851 the locomotive remained in service until 1978.

See also
 List of stock used by Swiss Federal Railways
 British Rail 18000 - Contemporary gas turbine locomotive, also built by Brown Boveri

References 

Am 4 6
Brown, Boveri & Cie locomotives
Gas turbine locomotives of Switzerland
 Scrapped locomotives
Standard gauge locomotives of Switzerland
1′Do1′ locomotives
(1A)Bo(A1) locomotives
Railway locomotives introduced in 1941
Gas turbine locomotives